Vijftig jaren  is a 1948 Dutch film directed by Ernst Winar.

Cast
Theo Frenkel		
Bierman Harrie		
Mara Josso		
Minny van Ollefen		
Jules Verstraete

External links 
 

1948 films
Dutch black-and-white films
Dutch drama films
1948 drama films